1980–1982 is a double album compiled, digitalized and mastered for CD in Netherlands, containing the first single (1980), cassette (1981) and LP (1982) by Esplendor Geométrico in Spain.

Track listing

Notes
 Cover: Designs by Juan-Carlos Sastre.
 Titles: “El Acero del Partido” (The Steel of Party) was inspired on the metallurgical complex in Elbasan(Albania). “Héroe del Trabajo” (Hero of Labor) was inspired on the Albanian honorific title for civilians workers.
 CD 1 was previously released as the “Eg1” cassette (later CD with bonus tracks). CD 2 was previously released as the CD “El Acero del Partido” (including the LP “El Acero del Partido” and the single “Necrosis en la poya”).
 The contents of this record (sounds & lyrics) may provoke moral shock; if not, pump up the volume!

References
 Allmusic: Album 1980-1982
 Discogs: 1980-1982 Album

1993 albums
Esplendor Geométrico albums